Šime Ljubić (24 May 1822 – 19 October 1896) was an archaeologist, theologian, and historian, best known as one of the founders of Croatian archaeology.

Ljubić studied theology in Zagreb and history and Slavic studies in Vienna. He was the director of the Split Archaeological Museum and collected materials from the Archives of Venice that were later published by the Yugoslav Academy of Sciences and Arts. Later he was director of the Archaeological Museum in Zagreb. He founded the Croatian Archaeological Society and its publication, Viestnik hrvatskoga areheologičkoga družtva.

Ljubić wrote about ancient numismatics, prehistoric and Roman finds, Marco Antonio de Dominis, Petar Hektorović, and the relations between the republics of Ragusa and Venice. He collected objects for the National Museum and published the medieval statutes of Budva, Skradin, and Hvar. He participated in the Illyrian movement in Dalmatia and wrote fiction.

Works
Numografia Dalmata, 1853
Dizionario biografico degli uomini illustri della Dalmazia, 1856
Studi archeologici sulla Dalmazia, 1860
Pregled hrvatske poviesti, 1864
Ob odnošajih dubrovačke sa mletačkom republikom tja do godine 1358, 1868
Ogledalo književne poviesti jugoslavjanske na podučavanje mladeži, 1869
Listine o odnošajih izmedju južnoga slavenstva i Mletačke Republike, 1870
Spomenici o Šćepanu Malom, 1870
Petar Hektorović, 1874
Statuta Et Leges Civitatis Buduae, Civitatis Scardonae, Et Civitatis Et Insulae Lesinae, 1882
Index Rerum, Personarum Et Locorum, 1893

Gallery

References

Sources

1822 births
1896 deaths
19th-century Croatian historians
Members of the Croatian Academy of Sciences and Arts
Members of the Serbian Academy of Sciences and Arts
People from Stari Grad, Croatia
People from the Kingdom of Dalmatia